Morten Solem (born 5 August 1980) is a Norwegian former ski jumper who competed from 1999 to 2007. His best results at World Cup level were four top 10 finishes, with a seventh place in Liberec on 11 January 2004 as his best individual result. He also finished second overall in the 2002–03 and 2005–06 Continental Cup seasons.

External links

1980 births
Living people
Norwegian male ski jumpers
Sportspeople from Trondheim